Vančo Trajanov (born 9 August 1978) is a former Macedonian footballer who played as a midfielder.

He was the first – and, to date, only – non-Bulgarian to have made more than 300 Bulgarian First League appearances (making him the highest-appearing non-Bulgarian in the First League's history). At international level, Trajanov played for the Macedonian national team 35 times between 2001 and 2009.

Club career
Trajanov began his career in FK Bregalnica Delčevo.

In 2002, Trajanov was signed by fellow Bulgarian A Group club Lokomotiv Plovdiv with whom he would win the league in the season of 2003–04.

After success in Bulgaria, he moved to Germany to play for Arminia Bielefeld but failed to establish himself within the first team. Trajanov made his début for Arminia in a 4–2 win over 1. FC Köln II in the DFB-Pokal on 21 September 2004, coming on as a substitute. He made his Bundesliga début on 12 December 2004 as a second-half substitute in a 5–0 defeat to VfL Wolfsburg at Volkswagen Arena. This was to be his last appearance for Arminia.

In October 2006, Trajanov returned to Bulgaria to play for Chernomorets Burgas. For two-and-a-half seasons, he earned 59 appearances and scored one goal in a 1–0 home win against Marek Dupnitsa on 26 October 2007.

On 15 September 2010, Trajanov joined Minyor Pernik; fourth Bulgarian team in his career. At the start of the 2012–13 season he was selected as the new team captain. On 6 November 2012, Trajanov dissolved his contract due to financial reasons.

On 8 January 2013, Trajanov re-signed for Chernomorets Burgas on a free transfer. On 20 February 2017, he reached a historic milestone - Trajanov became the first foreign player to appear in 300 matches in the top Bulgarian division. Serbian Nebojša Jelenković (with 293 games) is in second place among foreign footballers.

On 14 June 2018, Trajanov announced his retirement as an active footballer, though he subsequently made a few appearances for Oborishte.

International career
He made his senior debut for Macedonia in a June 2001 FIFA World Cup qualification match against Moldova in Skopje. On 16 October 2002, Trajanov scored goal during Macedonia's Euro 2004 qualifying match against England at St Mary's Stadium, which finished 2–2. In all Trajanov gained 36 caps, making his final appearance for Macedonia in the 4–0 loss against Netherlands on 1 April 2009.

Honours

Club
Lokomotiv Plovdiv
 A Group: 2003–04

References

External links
 
 
 
 Profile at MacedonianFootball 

1978 births
Living people
People from Delčevo
Association football midfielders
Macedonian footballers
North Macedonia international footballers
FK Pelister players
FK Napredok players
PFC Velbazhd Kyustendil players
PFC Lokomotiv Plovdiv players
Arminia Bielefeld players
PFC Chernomorets Burgas players
Maccabi Petah Tikva F.C. players
PFC Minyor Pernik players
FC Oborishte players
Macedonian First Football League players
First Professional Football League (Bulgaria) players
Bundesliga players
Second Professional Football League (Bulgaria) players
Israeli Premier League players
Macedonian expatriate footballers
Macedonian expatriate sportspeople in Bulgaria
Expatriate footballers in Bulgaria
Macedonian expatriate sportspeople in Germany
Expatriate footballers in Germany
Macedonian expatriate sportspeople in Israel
Expatriate footballers in Israel